A card association or a bank card association is a network of issuing banks and acquiring banks that process payment cards of a specific brand.

Examples

Familiar payment card association brands include China UnionPay, RuPay, American Express, Discover, Diners Club, Troy and JCB.

While once card associations, Visa and Mastercard have both become publicly traded companies.

Statistics

Among United States consumers alone, over 600 million payment cards are in circulation.

References

Payment cards
Merchant services